Akhona Nyiki (born 2 June 1992) is a South African former cricketer who played as a right-arm off break bowler. She appeared in one One Day International for South Africa in 2011, against Sri Lanka in the 2011 Women's Cricket World Cup Qualifier. She played domestic cricket for Border.

References

External links
 
 

1992 births
Living people
People from Raymond Mhlaba Local Municipality
South African women cricketers
South Africa women One Day International cricketers
Border women cricketers